The 12555 / 12556 Gorakhdham Express is a daily Superfast Express class train service of Indian Railways, which runs between the cities of Gorakhpur and Bathinda via Basti station, state capital of Uttar Pradesh; Lucknow, city of  and national capital .  It is considered one of the important trains of North Eastern Railway and Indian Railways as well.
Recently the train is running with the new LHB rakes.

Overview
This train is named after Guru Gorakhnath. Gorakhdham means Place of Guru Gorakhnath.  
It is ISO 9001:2015 certified train of Indian Railways.  Cleanliness and safety of passengers is the first motive of this train. This train is claimed to have cleanest and hygienic accommodation and toilets among the trains plying on the same route.
Regular security inspection of train is performed on-board by police personnel.
On-board housekeeping service regularly & on-demand cleans the toilets and coaches with feedback authorization from passengers.

Train got LHB coach from 14 March 2019.

History
Earlier this train used to run combined with Vaishali Express between  & New Delhi.  Independent operation of this train was demanded and Indian Railways foresaw the possibility of this. North Eastern Railway was assigned with the responsibility of presenting report on the practicality of this train. Project report was presented before the Railway Board and it was allowed. 
Hence in the year of 1998, Gorakhdham Express commenced its first independent operation from Gorakhpur Junction to New Delhi as an express train having bi-weekly frequency.
Again after few years of service this train was extended till  and recently extended upto  then this train operates between Gorakhpur Junction & Bhatinda Junction from 14th July 2022. 
This is the first Superfast Express train of Bhatinda Junction.

Facilities

This train has facility of E-catering  for providing food from Domino's Pizza etc. & on-board catering, for providing snacks, foods, tea/coffee, beverages. 
On-demand housekeeping service is provided, which maintains the cleanness of coaches, as well as of toilets.

Route & halts

Schedule

Accommodation

This train consists of 22 coaches – 8 Sleeper coaches, 5 Air-Conditioned coaches, 2 Chair-Car coaches & 5 Unreserved coaches and 2 EOG. 
5 Air-Conditioned coaches consists of 1 First Class, 1 Second Class & 3 Third Class coaches.

Management

This train is owned, operated & maintained by Lucknow division of North Eastern Railway zone of Indian Railways. Being prioritized & important train, North Eastern Railway Headquarters Gorakhpur Junction itself monitors this train for better quality & services.  
This train is one of the most important trains of Hissar, as well as of Gorakhpur Junction.

Locomotive
It is hauled by an Ajni / Kalyan-based WAP-7 locomotive between Gorakhpur Junction & Hisar Junction and vice versa.

Accidents
In dense fog on 2 January 2010, the Gorakhdham Express and Prayagraj Express collided near the Panki railway station in Kanpur, about 60 miles (100 kilometers) southwest of Lucknow. Ten people died and about 51 were injured.

On 26 May 2014, it rammed into a stationary goods train near Khalilabad station in Sant Kabir Nagar district of Uttar Pradesh, on its way to Gorakhpur. More than 40 people were killed and over 150 were injured.

In 2004, the train hit a truck which was standing on tracks. Luckily the truck was driverless.

Gallery

References

External links
  Indian Railways

Transport in Hisar (city)
Named passenger trains of India
Express trains in India
Passenger trains originating from Gorakhpur
Rail transport in Delhi
Rail transport in Haryana
Railway services introduced in 2001
Rail transport in Uttar Pradesh